Kofi Amponsah (born 23 April 1978) is a Ghanaian former professional footballer who played as a centre-back.

Club career 
Amponsah was born in Accra, Ghana. He played domestically for Ghapoha Readers before spending ten years in Greek football with Panelefsiniakos, Olympiacos, PAOK FC, AEK Athens, Egaleo F.C. and Apollon Kalamarias and then playing in Cyprus for Enosis Neon Paralimni.

International career 
Amponsah was part of the Ghana national team at the 2002 African Nations Cup, which exited in the quarter-finals after losing to Nigeria, having finished second in Group B.

Honours
Ghapoha Readers
 Ghanaian FA Cup: 1996–97

Olympiacos
 Alpha Ethniki: 1998–99, 1999–2000
 Greek Cup: 1998–99

PAOK
 Greek Cup: 2000–01, 2002–03

References

External links
 

Living people
1978 births
Ghanaian footballers
Footballers from Accra
Association football defenders
Ghana international footballers
Ghana under-20 international footballers
2002 African Cup of Nations players
Ghapoha Readers players
Panelefsiniakos F.C. players
AEK Athens F.C. players
PAOK FC players
Egaleo F.C. players
Enosis Neon Paralimni FC players
Apollon Pontou FC players
Olympiacos F.C. players
Super League Greece players
Cypriot First Division players
Ghanaian expatriate footballers
Ghanaian expatriate sportspeople in Greece
Expatriate footballers in Greece
Ghanaian expatriate sportspeople in Cyprus
Expatriate footballers in Cyprus